Just 6.5 (means: Six and a Half per Meters) is a 2019 Iranian thriller drama film written and directed by Saeed Roustaee. It was well received by critics at the 76th Venice Film Festival, and won multiple awards, including the Crystal Simorgh for Audience Choice of Best Film, at the 37th Fajr Film Festival.

Plot 

Samad (Payman Maadi) is a narcotic detective in pursuit of a shadow drug kingpin Naser Khakzad (Navid Mohammadzadeh). One day a raid leads to capturing a low level dealer who leads to a bigger fish, who is somehow connected to the notorious druglord...

Cast 
Payman Maadi as Samad
Navid Mohammadzadeh as Naser Khakzad
Parinaz Izadyar as Elham
Farhad Aslani as Judge
Houman Kiai as Hamid
Maziar Seyedi as Misagh Ashkani
Hojjat Hassanpour Sargaroui as Sajjad
Ali Bagheri as Reza Moradi
Marjan Ghamari as Reza Moradi's wife

Release 
The film was screened at the 37th Fajr Film Festival, but had to be rescheduled because of technical difficulties in showing the film on the first day. Writing for website Eye for Film, Anton Bitel called the film "grim state-of-the-nation commentary" on Iranian society.

Reception

Critical response

Awards

References

External links
 
 
 
 
 

2019 films
2019 thriller drama films
Crystal Simorgh for Audience Choice of Best Film winners
Films directed by Saeed Roustayi
Iranian drama films
2010s Persian-language films